At the 1932 Summer Olympics in Los Angeles, four diving events were organized, two for men, and two for women. The competitions were held from Monday, 8 August 1932 to Saturday, 13 August 1932.

Medal summary
The events are labelled as 3 metre springboard and 10 metre platform by the International Olympic Committee, and appeared on the 1932 Official Report as springboard diving and high diving, respectively. The platform events included dives from both 10 metre and 5 metre platforms, but, from now on, the springboard events were reduced to dives from the 3 metre board.

Men

Women

Participating nations
A total of 28 divers (17 men and 11 women) from nine nations (men from seven nations - women from seven nations) competed at the Los Angeles Games:

  (men:1 women:1)
  (men:2 women:1)
  (men:0 women:1)
  (men:1 women:0)
  (men:1 women:1)
  (men:3 women:1)
  (men:5 women:0)
  (men:0 women:1)
  (men:4 women:5)

Medal table

References

 
1932 Summer Olympics events
1932
1932 in water sports